Goshen High School is a public high school in Goshen, Indiana, United States. It serves grades 9-12 for Goshen Community Schools.

Academics
Goshen High School has been accredited by the North Central Association, and its successors, since April 1, 1909.

In the 2019 U.S. News & World Report annual rankings, Goshen ranked 5,748th nationally and 132nd in Indiana.

Demographics
The demographic breakdown of the 2,016 students enrolled for 2020-21 was:
Male - 51.2%
Female - 48.8%
Native American/Alaskan - 0.05%
Asian - 1.0%
Black - 2.5%
Hispanic - 56.2%
White - 36.6%
Multiracial - 3.7%
85.1% of the students were eligible for free or reduced-cost lunch. For 2020–21, Goshen was a Title I school.

Athletics 
Goshen's RedHawks compete in the Northern Lakes Conference of Indiana. School colors are red, white and grey. , the following Indiana High School Athletic Association (IHSAA) sanctioned sports were offered:

Baseball (boys) 
Basketball (girls and boys) 
Cross country (girls and boys) 
Football (boys) 
State champion - 1978, 1988
Unified flag football (coed)
Golf (girls and boys) 
Soccer (girls and boys) 
Boys state champion - 2014
Softball (girls) 
Swim and dive (girls and boys) 
Tennis (girls and boys) 
Track and field (girls and boys) 
Unified track and field (coed)
Volleyball (girls) 
Wrestling (boys)

Mascot 
Goshen High School's school colors are red, white and grey. Before 2016, Goshen High School's mascot was the "Redskins" which featured a mascot wearing a Native American headdress. Beginning January 1, 2016, the school changed their mascot to the "Redhawks".

Notable alumni 
Kate Bolduan – CNN correspondent 
Speed Kelly – Major League Baseball infielder
Rick Mirer – NFL quarterback
John Rarick – politician

Notable staff
Bill Doba - former assistant football coach at Goshen, later head coach at Washington State University

See also
List of high schools in Indiana

References

External links

Public high schools in Indiana
Schools in Elkhart County, Indiana